Qongqothwane is a traditional song of the Xhosa people of South Africa. It is sung at weddings to bring good fortune. In the western world it is mainly known as The Click Song. The Xhosa title literally means "knock-knock beetle", which is a popular name for various species of darkling beetles that make a distinctive knocking sound by tapping their abdomens on the ground. These beetles are believed by the Xhosa to bring good luck and rain.

The song is known world-wide thanks to the interpretation of South African singer Miriam Makeba (herself a Xhosa). In her discography the song appears in several versions, both with the title Qongqothwane and as The Click Song. 

More information on the song can be found in Makeba's book The World of African Song (Chicago: Quadrangle Books, 1971), including the following translation: "The doctor of the road is the beetle / He climbed past this way / They say it is the beetle / Oh! It is the beetle."

She explains the song as a traditional folk song which refers to the knocking beetle which makes clicking sounds and can revolve the top part of its body in any direction. The beetle is used in children's games to point the way home, but also has a deeper symbolism, pointing the way to a better future in times of trouble. In her biography (p.86), she mentions singing it in The Village Vanguard Club in New York, and calls it a "Xhosa song about a dreamy bride".

Lyrics

Igqirha lendlela nguqongqothwane
Sel' eqabel' egqith' apha nguqongqothwane

A diviner of the roadways is the knock-knock beetle, 
Already it climbs up and passes by here, it's the knock-knock beetle.

Other versions
Cher released a version of the song as the lead-single of her 1968 album Backstage.
Four Jacks and a Jill released a version of the song on their 1965 album, Jimmy Come Lately.
Hugh Masekela included the song in his debut recording Trumpet Africaine (1962).
The Cool Crooners of Bulawayo include a version of the song on their 2003 album, Isatilo.

References

Songs about insects
Songs about luck
Songs about marriage
Miriam Makeba songs
Four Jacks and a Jill songs
South African folk songs
Year of song unknown